Mozaffarabad (also Romanized as Moz̧affarābād; also known as Moz̧affarābād Aḩmadī and Muzaffari) is a village in Shahidabad Rural District, Mashhad-e Morghab District, Khorrambid County, Fars Province, Iran. At the 2006 census, its population was 929, in 221 families.

References 

Populated places in Khorrambid County